Karon Joseph Riley (born August 23, 1978) is a former American NFL Player, actor, producer and gridiron football defensive lineman who most recently played for the Cleveland Gladiators of the Arena Football League (2007–08).

High school career
At Martin Luther King High School in Detroit, Michigan, Riley starred in football, basketball, and track&field. As a senior, in football, he was an All-City choice, an All-Metro choice, and an All-State choice.

Professional career
Karon Joseph Riley entered the National Football League by being selected by the Chicago Bears in the 4th round (103rd overall pick) of the 2001 NFL Draft out of the University of Minnesota. He played with the Bears in 2001 and the Atlanta Falcons (2003-2004).

In 2005, he played two games in the Canadian Football League with the Toronto Argonauts.

On January 30, 2006, Riley signed with the Redskins as an unrestricted free agent but was released on August 28, 2006

Karon Joseph Riley played two seasons in the Arena Football League with the Las Vegas/Cleveland Gladiators (2007–2008) as an offensive lineman/defensive lineman. On August 8, 2008 Riley was removed from the Gladiators roster and reassigned to the Arena Football 1 League office.

Acting career 
Riley has appeared in a few films and television shows since 2010 including Tyler Perry's Meet the Browns, 35 and Ticking, The Last Punch, Last Call, Mann & Wife and the 2019 film Little.

In 2019, Riley appeared in a recurring role on Bounce TV soap opera-drama Saints & Sinners.  He was the first replacement made in the series recast as the character Malik Thompson, previously portrayed by Anthony Dalton in 2018.

He is also a film producer, in which his credits include two films.

Personal life
Karon is married to actress Terri J. Vaughn and on April 24, 2008 Vaughn welcomed their first child, a son named Kal'El Joseph Riley.

Filmography

Film

Television

References

1978 births
Living people
Martin Luther King High School (Detroit) alumni
Players of American football from Detroit
American football linebackers
American football offensive linemen
American football defensive ends
SMU Mustangs football players
Minnesota Golden Gophers football players
Chicago Bears players
Atlanta Falcons players
Canadian football defensive linemen
African-American players of Canadian football
Toronto Argonauts players
Las Vegas Gladiators players
Cleveland Gladiators players
21st-century African-American sportspeople
20th-century African-American sportspeople